Nestor Perez Alonso (born November 24, 1976) is a Cuban former professional baseball shortstop who was most recently manager of the Augusta GreenJackets, the Low-A East affiliate of the Atlanta Braves.

Perez began his career in the Serie Nacional de Béisbol before defecting to the United States. He signed with the Tampa Bay Devil Rays organization in 1998, playing with the team’s minor league system until 2005. During the 2005 season, he had a brief stint with the Colorado Rockies Double-A affiliate before returning to Tampa Bay to finish both the season and his Minor League Baseball (MiLB) career.

After leaving Minor League Baseball, Perez played in the División de Honor de Béisbol, the highest level of baseball in Spain. He also played for the Spain national baseball team in the 2003 European Baseball Championship, 2005 European Baseball Championship, 2005 Baseball World Cup, 2007 European Baseball Championship, 2007 Baseball World Cup, 2008 European Cup, 2009 European Cup and 2013 World Baseball Classic.

References

External links

1976 births
Baseball shortstops
Living people
2013 World Baseball Classic players
Princeton Devil Rays players
Charleston RiverDogs players
St. Petersburg Devil Rays players
Orlando Rays players
Bakersfield Blaze players
Montgomery Biscuits players
Tulsa Drillers players
Visalia Oaks players
Minor league baseball coaches
Spanish baseball coaches